Amal Amin (born 1929) is an Egyptian botanist.

She participated in naming the following plants:

 Asteraceae Echinops taeckholmianus Amin
 Asteraceae Launaea subgen. Microrrhynchus (Less.) Amin ex Rech.f.
 Asteraceae Launaea subgen. Pseudosonchus Amin ex Rech.f.
 Asteraceae Launaea sect. Pseudosonchus (Amin ex Rech.f.) N.Kilian
 Asteraceae Launaea subgen. Zollikoferia (DC.) Amin ex Rech.f.
 Asteraceae Launaea brunneri (Webb) Amin ex Boulos
 Asteraceae Launaea exauriculata (Oliv. & Hiern) Amin ex Boulos
 Asteraceae Launaea polydichotoma (Ostenf.) Amin ex N.Kilian
 Asteraceae Launaea procumbens (Roxb.) Amin
 Asteraceae Launaea remotiflora (DC.) Amin ex Rech.f.
 Asteraceae Launaea rueppellii (Sch.Bip.) Amin ex Boulos
 Asteraceae Launaea taraxacifolia (Willd.) Amin ex C.Jeffrey

The species Launaea amal-aminiae is named after her.

References

Living people
1929 births
Egyptian scientists